Serol Demirhan (born December 5, 1988) is a Turkish footballer who currently plays as a left back.

References

External links

1988 births
Living people
Turkish footballers
Ankaraspor footballers
MKE Ankaragücü footballers
Mersin İdman Yurdu footballers
Eskişehirspor footballers
Kahramanmaraşspor footballers
Süper Lig players
TFF First League players
TFF Second League players
Association football defenders
People from Altındağ, Ankara
Turkey youth international footballers